Chauve Souris is an island in Seychelles, lying 400 m northeast of the island of Praslin. Another nearby island - Saint-Pierre Island is located immediately in the north. The island is a granite island covered with tropical forest. Fauna is limited to the likes of skinks, geckos and limited birdlife that chiefly use the island as a roost.

The island is privately owned. 
Chauve Souris Island has a small resort: Club Vacanze Seychelles.
There is also a Chauve Souris island near the western coast of the island of Mahé.

Tourism
Today, the island's main industry is tourism.

Image gallery

References 

Islands of Baie Sainte Anne
Private islands of Seychelles